Đorđe Konjović (born 2 January 1931) is a Serbian retired basketball player. He represented the Yugoslavia national basketball team internationally.

Playing career 
During his playing career in the 1950s, Konjović was on Belgrade-based teams Crvena zvezda and Partizan of the Yugoslav Federal League and two of the biggest and most popular clubs in Serbia. He is one of eight players who recorded at least 30 points in the Crvena zvezda–Partizan derbies for both teams.

Konjović won three Yugoslav Championships with the Zvezda team coached by Nebojša Popović. During this stint he played with    Milan Bjegojević, Đorđe Andrijašević, Ladislav Demšar, Srđan Kalember, and Borislav Ćurčić.

National team career
Konjović was a member of the Yugoslavia national team that participated at the 1954 FIBA World Championship. Over four tournament games, he averaged 1.7 points per game. In the next year, he was a member of the team that participated at the 1955 European Championship. Over eleven tournament games, he averaged 5.6 points per game.

Konjović was the first player taller than  who played for Yugoslavia.

Career achievements and awards 
 Yugoslav League champion: 3 (with Crvena zvezda: 1953, 1954, 1955).

Personal life 

References

1931 births
Centers (basketball)
Living people
KK Crvena zvezda players
KK Partizan players
Yugoslav men's basketball players
People from Senta
1954 FIBA World Championship players